Łukasz Parobiec (born May 7, 1980) is a Polish Heavyweight MMA fighter and kickboxer, current ISKA World champion, and bareknuckle boxer.

Mixed martial arts career

Early career
Parobiec made his professional MMA debut in October 2007.  After losing his first three bouts all by submission, Parobiec won his next nine fights in a row. Over the last decade he has amassed a record of 12 wins against 6 losses

Bellator MMA
Parobiec was scheduled to make his Bellator MMA debut against Neil Grove on 19 May 2017 at Bellator 170. However, the fight was cancelled for undisclosed reasons.

Kickboxing career
He was late replacement for Arnold Oborotov to challenge Lukasz Krupadziorow for ISKA World title on May 16, 2015, in Wembley Arena, London. Besides being last day replacement and relatively inexperienced in kickboxing he managed to upset Krupadziorow and win the fight via 1st-round KO.

Titles

Kickboxing
2016 CRC K-1 Heavyweight Champion
2015 ISKA World Super-heavyweight (+100 kg/+220 lb) K-1 Rules Champion
2015 DUEL Super-heavyweight K-1 Rules Tournament Runner Up

MMA
2015 Warrior Fight Series Heavyweight (-120 kg/-225 lb) Champion

Kickboxing record

|-
|-  style="background:#CCFFCC"
| 2016-12-11 || Win ||style="text-align:left"| Daragh Kennedy || CRC 3 || Dublin, Ireland || Decision (Unanimous) || 3  || 3:00 || 6-1
|-
! style=background:white colspan=9 |
|-
|-  style="background:#CCFFCC"
| 2016-04-09 || Win ||style="text-align:left"| Darren Moffitt || DUEL 6 || Newcastle, England || TKO (Knee) || 2 || || 5-1
|-
|-  style="background:#CCFFCC"
| 2015-09-27 || Win ||style="text-align:left"| James Cannon || DUEL 5 || Newcastle, England || Decision || 3  || 3:00 || 4-1
|-
|-  style="background:#CCFFCC"
| 2015-05-16 || Win ||style="text-align:left"| Lukasz Krupadziorow || Super Fight Series: Episode I Cosmic Collision || London, England || KO || 1  || 0:21 || 3-1
|-
! style=background:white colspan=9 |
|-
|-  style="background:#FFBBBB"
| 2015-03-21 || Loss ||style="text-align:left"| Paul Venis || Duel 4: KUMITE, Final || Newcastle, England || KO || 1  || || 2-1
|-
! style=background:white colspan=9 |
|-
|-  style="background:#CCFFCC"
| 2015-03-21 || Win ||style="text-align:left"| Darren Moffitt || Duel 4: KUMITE, Semi Finals || Newcastle, England || TKO || 2  ||  || 2-0
|-
|-  style="background:#CCFFCC"
| 2014-05-10 || Win ||style="text-align:left"| Michael Holmes  || MMA Total Combat 58  || Spennymoor, England || TKO (Liver Kick) || 1 || || 1-0
|-
|-
| colspan=9 | Legend:

Mixed martial arts record

|-
| Loss
|style="text-align:center"|12-10-1
|Todd Stoute
| TKO (punches)
| Brave CF 30
| 
| style="text-align:center"|2
| style="text-align:center"|1:56
| Hyderabad, India
| 
|-
|-
|Draw
|style="text-align:center"|12-8-2
|Chi Lewis-Parry
|Draw (majority)
| Rise of Champions 7
|
|style="text-align:center"| 3
|style="text-align:center"| 5:00
|Brentwood, England
| 
|-
|-
|Loss
|style="text-align:center"|12-8-1
|Marthin Hamlet
|Decision (Unanimous)
| Cage Warriors: Academy Denmark 2
|
|style="text-align:center"| 3
|style="text-align:center"| 5:00
|Frederikshavn, Denmark
| 
|-
|-
| Loss
|style="text-align:center"|12-8-1
|Wagner Prado
| TKO (punch)
| KSW 45: The Return To Wembley
| 
| style="text-align:center"|1
| style="text-align:center"|0:40
| London, England
| 
|-
|-
|Draw
|style="text-align:center"|12-7-1
|Chi Lewis-Parry
|Draw (majority)
| BAMMA Fight Night: London
|
|style="text-align:center"| 3
|style="text-align:center"| 5:00
|London, England
| 
|-
|-
|Loss
|style="text-align:center"|12-7
|Mauro Cerilli
|Decision (Unanimous)
| Magnum Fighting Championship 2
|
|style="text-align:center"| 3
|style="text-align:center"| 5:00
|Rome, Italy
| 
|-
|-
|Loss
|style="text-align:center"|12-6
|Karol Celinski
|TKO (punches)
|ACB 53: Young Eagles 15
|
|style="text-align:center"| 3
|style="text-align:center"| 4:06
|Olsztyn, Poland
| 
|-
|Win
|style="text-align:center"|12-5
|Tom Aspinall
|DQ (illegal downward elbow)
|BAMMA 25: Champion vs. Champion
|
|style="text-align:center"| 2
|style="text-align:center"| 3:33
|Birmingham, England
| 
|-
|Loss
|style="text-align:center"|11-5
|Anatoli Ciumac
|Decision (unanimous)
|RXF 21 - MMA All Stars 2
|
|style="text-align:center"| 3
|style="text-align:center"| 5:00
|Bucharest, Romania
| 
|-
|Win
|style="text-align:center"|11-4
|Jonathan Dargan
|TKO (punches)
|BAMMA 22: Duquesnoy vs. Loughnane
|
|style="text-align:center"| 1
|style="text-align:center"| 3:27
|Dublin, Ireland
| 
|-
|Win
|style="text-align:center"|10-4
|Mike Neun
|TKO  
|Warrior Fight Series 2
|
|style="text-align:center"| 1
|style="text-align:center"| 1:24
|Swanley, England
|Vacant WFS Heavyweight Championship.
|-
|Loss
|style="text-align:center"|9-4
|Phil De Fries
|Submission (rear-naked choke)
|M4tC 15: Bad Blood
|
|style="text-align:center"| 1
|style="text-align:center"| 2:03
|Sunderland, England
| 
|-
|Win
|style="text-align:center"|9-3
|Sam Schilder
|TKO (knee)
|Pitbull Fighting Championship 1 - Battle Of Britain
|
|style="text-align:center"| 1
|style="text-align:center"| 2:15
|Blackpool, England
| 
|-
|Win
|style="text-align:center"|8-3
|Erdem Ciftci
|TKO (punches)
|Senshi MMA - The Warrior Spirit
|
|style="text-align:center"| 2
|style="text-align:center"| 1:01
|Sunderland, England
| 
|-
|Win
|style="text-align:center"|7-3
|Callum Cook
|Submission (triangle choke)
|MMA Total Combat 57
|
|style="text-align:center"| 2
|style="text-align:center"| 	2:16
|Spennymoor, England
| 
|-
|Win
|style="text-align:center"|6-3
|Jason Tyldesley
|Submission (strikes)
|Alpha Male Fighting Championships 3
|
|style="text-align:center"| 1
|style="text-align:center"| 	0:53
|Scarborough, England
| 
|-
|Win
|style="text-align:center"|5-3
|Wayne Fairless
|TKO (punches)
|MMA Total Combat 55
|
|style="text-align:center"| 1
|style="text-align:center"| 	0:33
|Spennymoor, England
| 
|-
|Win
|style="text-align:center"|4-3
|Kristan Bircher
|KO
|MMA Total Combat 52
|
|style="text-align:center"| 1
|style="text-align:center"| 	0:37
|Spennymoor, England
| 
|-
|Win
|style="text-align:center"|3-3
|Scott Forster
|TKO (punches)
|Supremacy Fight Challenge 5
|
|style="text-align:center"| 1
|style="text-align:center"| 1:18
|Sunderland, England
| 
|-
|Win
|style="text-align:center"|2-3
|Simon Lee
|TKO (punches)
|Supremacy Fight Challenge 5
|
|style="text-align:center"| 1
|style="text-align:center"| 2:42
|Sunderland, England
| 
|-
|Win
|style="text-align:center"|1-3
|Neil Robbins
|Submission (kneebar)
|Total Combat 33
|
|style="text-align:center"| 2
|style="text-align:center"| 2:20
|Sunderland, England
| 
|-
|Loss
|style="text-align:center"|0-3
|Steve Watson
|Submission (armbar)
|Total Combat 32
|
|style="text-align:center"| 1
|style="text-align:center"| 1:19
|Sunderland, England
| 
|-
|Loss
|style="text-align:center"|0-2
|Andrew Punshon
|Submission (armbar)
|Total Combat 29
|
|style="text-align:center"| 1
|style="text-align:center"| 2:44
|Sunderland, England
| 
|-
|Loss
|style="text-align:center"|0-1
|Cliff Moore
|Submission (rear-naked choke)
|Ultimate Force 7
|
|style="text-align:center"| 1
|style="text-align:center"| 3:19
|England
| 
|-

Amateur and bare mixed martial arts record

|-
|Loss
|style="text-align:center"|1-1
|Horace Price
|Decision (split)
|Total Combat 28
|
|style="text-align:center"| 2
|style="text-align:center"| 5:00
|Sunderland, England
| 
|-
|Win
|style="text-align:center"|1-0
|Stuart Austin
|TKO (punches)
|Strike and Submit 4
|
|style="text-align:center"| 1
|style="text-align:center"| 2:30
|Gateshead, Ireland
| 
|-

|-
|win
|style="text-align:center"|1-0
|Kamil Mękal
|TKO(kicking a rival out of the arena)
| Wotore 1
|
|style="text-align:center"| 1
|style="text-align:center"| 1:34
|Katowice, Poland
|Superfight 
|}

Bare knuckle record

| Win
| style="text-align:center"| 7-3
| Mariusz Kruczek
| KO (punches)
| Gromda 9: Balboa vs. Godbeer
|
| style="text-align:center"| 3
| style="text-align:center"| 1:39
| Pionki, Poland
| Won the grand final Gromda
|-
| Win
| style="text-align:center"| 6-3
| Daniel Więcławski
| KO (punches)
| Gromda 8 
|
| style="text-align:center"| 5
| style="text-align:center"| 4:57
| Pionki, Poland
| Gromda Final Tournament
|-
| Win
| style="text-align:center"| 5-3
| Adam Ziomek
| TKO (punches)
| Gromda 8
|
| style="text-align:center"| 5
| style="text-align:center"| 22:36
| Pionki, Poland
| Gromda Semi-Final Tournament
|-
|Win
|style="text-align:center"|4-3
|Tobiasz Adriańczyk		
|TKO (punches)
|Gromda 8
|
|style="text-align:center"|1
|style="text-align:center"|1:18
| Pionki, Poland
| Gromda Tournament Quarterfinals
|-
|Win
|style="text-align:center"|3-3
|Bartłomiej Bielas 
|TKO (punches)
|Gromda 6: Zadyma vs. Vasyl
|
|style="text-align:center"|3
|style="text-align:center"|1:30
| Pionki, Poland
|Extra Fight
|-
|Win
|style="text-align:center"|2-3
|Karol Grzesiuk 
|TKO (punches)
|Gromda 5
| 
|style="text-align:center"|1
|style="text-align:center"|1:17
| Pionki, Poland
| Extra Fight
|-
|loss
|style="text-align:center"|1-3
|Bartłomiej Bielas
|TKO (corner stoppage)
|Gromda 4: Miasto Grzechu
|
|style="text-align:center"|4
|style="text-align:center"|1:25
| Pionki, Poland
|Extra Fight
|-
|loss
|style="text-align:center"|1-2
|Dawid Żółtaszek
|TKO (corner stoppage)
|Gromda 2
|
|style="text-align:center"|1
|style="text-align:center"|0:44
| Pionki, Poland
| Gromda Semi-Final Tournament
|-
|Win
|style="text-align:center"|1–1
|Miłosz Wodecki
|TKO (punches)
|Gromda 2
|
|style="text-align:center"|1
|style="text-align:center"|0:45
| Pionki, Poland
|Gromda Tournament Quarterfinals
|-
|loss
|style="text-align:center"|0–1
|Lee McGary
|KO (punches)
| Ultimate Bare Knuckle Boxing
|
|style="text-align:center"|1
|style="text-align:center"|0:46
|Manchester, England, United States
| Eliminator for the championship title in the heavy category UBKB
|-

References

External links
 
 
 

1980 births
Living people
Polish male mixed martial artists
Polish male kickboxers
Heavyweight mixed martial artists
Mixed martial artists utilizing kickboxing
Place of birth missing (living people)